Elm Creek is the name of the following locations:

Places

In the United States
 Elm Creek Township, Martin County, Minnesota
 Elm Creek, Nebraska, Buffalo County
 Elm Creek Township, Buffalo County, Nebraska
 Elm Creek, Texas, Maverick County

Elsewhere
 Elm Creek, Manitoba, Canada

Waterways

In the United States
 Elm Creek (Neosho River), in Morris County, Kansas
 Elm Creek (Blue Earth River tributary), in the Minnesota counties of Jackson, Martin, and Faribault
 Elm Creek (Chariton River), a stream in Schuyler County, Missouri
 Elm Creek (Cheyenne River), a stream in Fall River and Custer counties, South Dakota
 Elm Creek (Nueces River), a tributary of the Nueces River, in Maverick County, Texas
 Elm Creek (Brazos River), a tributary of the Brazos River, McLennan County, Texas
 Elm Creek (Clear Fork Brazos River), a river in Palo Pinto County, Texas
 Elm Creek (Guadalupe County), the name of two separate streams in Guadalupe County, Texas
 Elm Creek (Rio Grande), a tributary of the Rio Grande River, in Maverick County, Texas
 Elm Creek (Wood County, Wisconsin), a stream in Wisconsin

See also
 ELM (disambiguation)
 Elm River (disambiguation)